Deh Tall Rural District is a rural district (dehestan) in the Central District of Bastak County, Hormozgan Province, Iran. At the 2006 census, its population was 6,558, in 1,409 families. The rural district has 22 villages.

References 

Rural Districts of Hormozgan Province
Bastak County